David Cunliffe announced his first frontbench team on 23 September 2013, a week after he was elected Leader of the Labour Party. Following the April 2014 resignation of senior MP Shane Jones, Cunliffe reshuffled his Shadow Ministry on 6 May. Cunliffe ranked his top 25 MPs, with the remainder listed alphabetically. MPs who announced they would not contest the 2014 general election are listed last.

As the Labour Party formed the largest party not in government, this frontbench team was as a result the Official Opposition of the New Zealand House of Representatives.

References

New Zealand Labour Party
Cunliffe, David
2013 in New Zealand
2013 establishments in New Zealand
2014 disestablishments in New Zealand